Petter Löberg (born 17 August 1968) is a Swedish politician and member of the Riksdag for the Swedish Social Democratic Party. He is currently taking up seat number 43 in the Riksdag for the constituency of Västra Götaland County South. Since 2014 he has been a member of the Committee on Justice.

Löberg started his political career in the Swedish Social Democratic Youth League in the 80s. He later became a member of the municipal council for his home municipality of Borås. He is vice chairman of the Street Committee and a member of the municipal board. During February and March 2010 he was a substitute for Phia Andersson for the constituency of Västra Götaland County South. He has been a full member of the Riksdag since the 2014 general election.

References 

1968 births
Living people
People from Borås
Members of the Riksdag from the Social Democrats
Members of the Riksdag 2014–2018
Members of the Riksdag 2018–2022
University of Gothenburg alumni
Members of the Riksdag 2022–2026
21st-century Swedish politicians